Ben Folds Presents: University A Cappella! is an album produced by Ben Folds featuring collegiate a cappella music groups from the United States. Folds became interested in a cappella music after hearing his song "Brick" performed by an Ohio University group.

Track listing 
 "Not the Same" – The Spartones from The University of North Carolina at Greensboro – 4:11
 "Jesusland" – The University of North Carolina at Chapel Hill's Loreleis – 4:20
 "Brick" – The Ohio University Leading Tones – 4:02
 "You Don't Know Me" – The University of Georgia's With Someone Else's Money – 3:08
 "Still Fighting It" – The Washington University in St. Louis' Mosaic Whispers – 4:32
 "Boxing" – Ben Folds – 4:23
 "Selfless, Cold and Composed" – The Sacramento State Jazz Singers – 6:25
 "Magic" – The University of Chicago's Voices in Your Head – 5:09
 "Landed" – The University of Colorado Buffoons – 4:11
 "Time" – The Princeton Nassoons – 4:03
 "Effington" – Ben Folds, Gracie Folds, Louis Folds – 3:27
 "Evaporated" – The Newtones from Newton, Massachusetts – 5:27
 "Fred Jones Part 2" – The West Chester University of Pennsylvania Gracenotes – 3:43
 "Army" – The University of Rochester Midnight Ramblers – 3:12
 "Fair" – The University of Wisconsin-Eau Claire Fifth Element – 4:24
 "The Luckiest" – The Washington University in St. Louis' The Amateurs – 4:50

References

External links
 Information at benfolds.com
 

2009 albums
Ben Folds albums
Albums produced by Ben Folds
Collaborative albums
Sony Music albums
A cappella albums